Calathus refleximargo is a species of ground beetle from the Platyninae subfamily that is endemic to the Canary Islands.

References

refleximargo
Beetles described in 1992
Endemic beetles of the Canary Islands